Zeiselbach is a small river of Bavaria, Germany. It is a tributary of the Tegernsee, which is drained by the Mangfall.

See also
List of rivers of Bavaria

Rivers of Bavaria
Rivers of Germany